Weimar High School is a public high school located in Weimar, Texas (USA) and classified as a 2A school by the UIL. It is part of the Weimar Independent School District located in western Colorado County. In 2015, the school was rated "Met Standard" by the Texas Education Agency.

Extracurricular activities
Weimar High School's athletic teams are known as the Wildcats and Ladycats. Weimar High School also fields strong UIL academic teams in addition to an award-winning FFA Chapter- 

Baseball
Basketball
Cross Country
Football
Golf
Powerlifting
Softball
Tennis
Track and Field
Volleyball

State championships
Baseball - 
1996(2A), 1997(2A), 2000(2A), 2001(2A), 2003(2A)
Boys Golf - 
1969(1A), 1970(1A), 1990(2A), 1991(2A), 2012(2A), 2013(1A) 2014(1A)
Girls Golf - 
1989(2A) 2014(1A)
Softball - 
2002(2A), 2003(2A), 2006(2A), 2013(1A), 2014(1A)
Boys Track - 
1957(B), 1959(1A)
Girls Track - 
1990(2A)
One Act Play - 
1982(2A)
Girls Basketball
2016 (2A)

Literary Criticism
2004 (2A), 2007 (2A), 2009 (2A), 2016 (2A)

Lone Star Cup Champions: 2003, 2013, 2014

State finalists
Softball - 
2001(2A)
Baseball - 
2002(2A)

State semi-finalists

Baseball 
2013 (1A)

Boys Basketball
1979 (2A)

Softball 
2021 (2A) 2022 (2A) 

Girls Basketball 
2014 (1A), 2015 (2A), 2016 (2A)

Volleyball
2015 (2A), 2016 (2A)

References

External links
Weimar ISD

Schools in Colorado County, Texas
Public high schools in Texas